KSIB-FM (101.3 MHz) is a radio station located in Creston, Iowa that serves an eight-county area in southwest Iowa. It has been a country format station for most of its broadcast history. The station changed to talk format for six months in 2014 before returning to the country music format. KSIB also broadcasts local news, weather and sports. Local baseball, basketball and football games are broadcast live.

Broadcast Area
KSIB-FM reaches as far north as West Des Moines, and south of the Missouri-Iowa border. KSIB's prime broadcast area includes these 8 counties in Iowa: Adair, Adams, Clarke, Decatur, Madison, Ringgold, Taylor, and Union. News and sports are primarily covered from the counties of Adair, Adams, Ringgold and Union counties.

Programming
KSIB was founded in 1946 and has maintained the country format since its beginning, except for six months beginning on March 31, 2014, when the format changed to talk. From 6 AM to 1 PM weekdays, the programming was predominantly local. The only exception was the nationally syndicated AgriTalk program from 10-11 AM. After 1 PM, The Dennis Miller Show, Herman Cain and others were broadcast until 6 AM the next day.

KSIB dropped its talk radio format after six months, on October 10, 2014. When it returned to the country music format, the station selected music from a wider range of artists and broadcast music from the last several decades as well as the newest releases in the genre. Also different from before, the music DJs are all local. Country begins at 1 PM every weekday with Melinda Mackey, also the host of KSIB's Grapevine show. Ben Walter, host of the KSIB Morning Show, is on after - from 6 PM to midnight.

The KSIB Morning Show has Ben Walter, KSIB News Director, TJ Dunphy and KSIB Sports Director, Damon Helgevold. Damon Helgevold also hosts a sports show, Midday Report, with interviews from local coaches, each weekday at 11 AM. Other local programs on KSIB include Trading Post (buy/sell/trade) Monday through Friday, Grapevine w/Melinda Mackey (local interest talk) airing every Monday and Thursday, The "Newsmakers" program with TJ Dunphy airs every Tuesday morning, Wednesdays Radio Ranch w/Chad Rieck (agriculture talk), and FridaysLevel B w/Ben Walter (outdoor living). AgriNews is carried at 10 AM each weekday.

Personalities
Ben Walter started part-time at the station in 1987. He hosts the KSIB Morning show every weekday morning - includes funeral announcements, birthdays/anniversaries, trivia, newscasts, weather, and sports. Melinda Mackey has been with KSIB for nearly 15 years - hosting the Grapevine program, Job Search, and more. Sports Director Damon Helgevold and News Director TJ Dunphy.

External links
KSIB website

SIB